Saba  is a genus of plant in the family Apocynaceae first described as a genus in 1849. It is native to Madagascar, Comoros, and mainland Africa.

Species
 Saba comorensis (Bojer ex A.DC.) Pichon - Madagascar, Comoros, Africa from Senegal to Somalia and south to Zimbabwe 
 Saba senegalensis (A.DC.) Pichon - Sahel from Senegal to Central African Republic 
 Saba thompsonii (A.Chev.) Pichon - W Africa (Benin, Togo, Burkina Faso, Ghana, Ivory Coast, Nigeria)

References

Rauvolfioideae
Apocynaceae genera